John Allan Shields (May 10, 1907 - September 24, 1975) was a Canadian professional ice hockey defenceman who played eleven seasons in the National Hockey League for the Ottawa Senators, Philadelphia Quakers, New York Americans, Montreal Maroons and Boston Bruins between 1927 and 1938.

Playing career
During the 1934–35 NHL season Shields won the Stanley Cup Championship with the Montreal Maroons.

Awards and achievements
Allan played in the longest game in NHL history. Montreal Maroons vrs. Detroit Red Wings, March 1936.

In 1934 he was selected to the first NHL All-Star team ever assembled.

In 1930/31 he along with Syd Howe and Wally Kilrea were loaned from Ottawa to the Philadelphia Quakers to help liven up the team and attract more Quaker fans. Philly was in bad financial shape at the time and needed greater attendance to survive.  With the assistance of Shields and company their games became "quite exciting", culminating with a Christmas Day game when the entire Philadelphia police force were called to quell a near riot. With the onset of the Depression, the team folded the following year. The Quakers set another near NHL record for games lost, however they were one of the more "lively" teams of the time.

On a couple of occasions during his career, he had to fill in as a goalie. In those days no spare goalie was available and if the one and only was injured during a game one of the players had to fill-in.

He played in the American Hockey League (the primary farm teams of the NHL) for the Washington Lions, Buffalo Bisons and the New Haven Eagles from 1938 to 1942. He served as playing coach for Washington and then enlisted in the RCAF. Shields was selected to All-Star teams twice during his AHL career

During his service in the airforce he was playing coach for the RCAF Sabres stationed in Arnprior, Ontario.

After the war, "Big Pete" went on to Referee in the AHL from 1946 to 1948 and then hung up his skates permanently.

He played a total of 457 game in professional hockey in the days when bus and train were the only means of transport.

Allan Shields was reported in the media at the time, as "a clean, rugged player" and "one of the most valuable defensemen in the entire league". King Clancy who was best man at Shields' wedding, had nothing but praise for Allan's ability as a defenseman.

Career statistics

Regular season and playoffs

References

External links

 
 

1907 births
1975 deaths
Boston Bruins players
Buffalo Bisons (AHL) players
Canadian ice hockey defencemen
Ice hockey people from Ottawa
Montreal Maroons players
New Haven Eagles players
New York Americans players
Ottawa Senators (1917) players
Ottawa Senators (original) players
Philadelphia Quakers (NHL) players
Stanley Cup champions
St. Louis Flyers (AHA) players
Washington Lions players
Canadian expatriate ice hockey players in the United States